Certified Public Accountant (CPA) is the title of qualified accountants in numerous countries in the English-speaking world. It is generally equivalent to the title of chartered accountant in other English-speaking countries. In the United States, the CPA is a license to provide accounting services to the public. It is awarded by each of the 50 states for practice in that state. Additionally, all states except Hawaii have passed mobility laws to allow CPAs from other states to practice in their state. State licensing requirements vary, but the minimum standard requirements include passing the Uniform Certified Public Accountant Examination, 150 semester units of college education, and one year of accounting-related experience.

Continuing professional education (CPE) is also required to maintain licensure. Individuals who have been awarded the CPA but have lapsed in the fulfillment of the required CPE or who have requested conversion to inactive status are in many states permitted to use the designation "CPA Inactive" or an equivalent phrase. In most U.S. states, only CPAs are legally able to provide attestation (including auditing) opinions on financial statements. Many CPAs are members of the American Institute of Certified Public Accountants and their state CPA society.

State laws vary widely regarding whether a non-CPA is even allowed to use the title "accountant". For example, Texas prohibits the use of the designations "accountant" and "auditor" by a person not certified as a Texas CPA, unless that person is a CPA in another state, is a non-resident of Texas, and otherwise meets the requirements for practice in Texas by out-of-state CPA firms and practitioners.

CPA in other countries 
In the United States, "CPA" is an initialism for Certified Public Accountant which is a designation given by a state governing agency, whereas other countries around the world have their own designations, which may be equivalent to "CPA".

In the United Kingdom, "CPA" is an initialism for Certified Public Accountant as well, but refers to an accounting and finance professional who is a member of the Certified Public Accountants Association (formerly the Association of Certified Public Accountants).

In Australia, the term "CPA" is an initialism for Certified Practicing Accountant. To become a CPA in Australia, it also requires a certain amount of education and experience to be eligible working in some specific areas in the accounting field.

In Canada, "CPA" is an initialism for Chartered Professional Accountant. This designation is for someone who would like to be a Canadian CPA. In order to be qualified for this certificate, candidates who major in accounting will get accepted to enter CPA Professional Education Program (CPA PEP). Provinces in Canada also allow non-accounting majors and international candidates to meet the requirements if they get into the CPA Prerequisite Education Program (CPA PREP).

History of profession 
In 1660, the first person who would conduct an audit was chosen in order to be able to manage the money that was raised by England in Virginia, United States. With the help of chartered accountants from England and Scotland for training Americans to learn the procedures of accounting, many firms were established in America. The first American one was in 1895.

On July 28, 1882, the Institute of Accountants and Bookkeepers of the City of New York became the first accounting corporation which supports the need of people in the accounting field and for educational purposes. With the accountancy and industry growing in the world, the need of looking for services from professional accountants who had higher standards and were recognized had been considered. In 1887, the American Association of Public Accountants was created to set moral standards for the practice of accounting.

On April 17, 1896, Chapter 312 of the Laws of the State of New York established that the Regents of the University of the State of New York would provide a Certificate of Public Accountancy to individuals over age 21, of good moral character, and who possessed or intended to declare citizenship in the United States with appropriate accounting education or experience either through examination or previous experience. This was the first time the title "Certified Public Accountant" was regulated. Examinations were held in both Buffalo and New York City. Frank Broaker was licensee #1 and he received his certificate solely through previous experience as a public accountant and did not take an examination, commonly referred to as grandfathering. Broaker died on November 12, 1941. The first person to receive the CPA through examination and previous experience was Joseph Hardcastle, who would go on to become an accounting theorist and New York University professor. Hardcastle died on June 16, 1906, after being thrown from a horse after an accident with a wagon. The Chapter was introduced by New York Senator Albert Wray, New York Assemblyman Henry Marshall, and signed by New York Governor Morton as part of business reform. The Regents appointed a Board of Examiners, similar to today's NASBA, the first members of which were Charles Sprague, Frank Broaker, and C. W. Haskins

Many accounting professionals believed the 150 credit requirement—implemented in several states first in 1988 and then expanded to nearly all states in 2001—would lead to more knowledgeable, experienced CPAs. The National Association of State Board of Accountancy (NASBA) collected and analyzed data from 1996 to 1998 to verify the effectiveness of the measure. Researchers studied more than 116,000 candidates who took the exam between 1996 and 1998. 33% of respondents had more than 150 college credit hours, while 67% had less than 150 credit hours. The research reveals that for candidates with less than 150 credits, only 13% passed the CPA exam on their first try. Conversely, for candidates with 150 or more credits, 21% passed the CPA exam on their first try. Some suggest extraneous variables—including the additional study time those possessing 150 credits likely have while still enrolled in university—could distort the verifiability of the study.

Services provided 
One important function performed by CPAs relates to assurance services. The most commonly performed assurance services are financial audit services where CPAs attest to the reasonableness of disclosures, the freedom from material misstatement, and the adherence to the applicable generally accepted accounting principles (GAAP) in financial statements. CPAs can also be employed within corporations (termed "the private sector" or "industry") in finance or operations positions such as financial analyst, finance manager, controller, chief financial officer (CFO), or chief executive officer (CEO). These CPAs do not provide services directly to the public.

Although some CPA firms serve as business consultants, the consulting role has been under scrutiny following the Enron scandal where Arthur Andersen simultaneously provided audit and consulting services which affected its ability to maintain independence in its audit duties. This incident resulted in many accounting firms divesting their consulting divisions, but this trend has since reversed. In audit engagements, CPAs are (and have always been) required by professional standards and Federal and State laws to maintain independence (both in fact and in appearance) from the entity for which they are conducting an attestation (audit and review) engagement. Although most individual CPAs who work as consultants do not also work as auditors, if the CPA firm is auditing the same company that the firm also does consulting work for, then there is a conflict of interest. This conflict voids the CPA firm's independence for multiple reasons, including: (1) the CPA firm would be auditing its own work or the work the firm suggested, and (2) the CPA firm may be pressured into unduly giving a positive (unmodified) audit opinion so as not to jeopardize the consulting revenue the firm receives from the client.

CPAs also have a niche within the income tax return preparation industry. Many small to mid-sized firms have both a tax and an auditing department. Along with attorneys and Enrolled Agents, CPAs may represent taxpayers in matters before the Internal Revenue Service (IRS). Although the IRS regulates the practice of tax representation, it has no authority to regulate tax return preparers.

Some states also allow unlicensed accountants to work as public accountants. For example, California allows unlicensed accountants to work as public accountants if they work under the control and supervision of a CPA. However, the California Board of Accountancy itself has determined that the terms "accountant" and "accounting" are misleading to members of the public, many of whom believe that a person who uses these terms must be licensed. As part of the California Poll, survey research showed that 55 percent of Californians believe that a person who advertises as an "accountant" must be licensed, 26 percent did not believe a license was required, and 19 percent did not know.

Whether providing services directly to the public or employed by corporations or associations, CPAs can operate in virtually any area of finance including:
 Assurance and attestation services
 Corporate finance (merger and acquisition, initial public offerings, share and debt issuings)
 Corporate governance
 Estate planning
 Financial accounting
 Governmental accounting
 Financial analysis
 Financial planning
 Forensic accounting (preventing, detecting, and investigating financial frauds)
 Income tax
 Information technology, especially as applied to accounting and auditing
 Management consulting and performance management
 Tax preparation and planning
 Venture capital
 Financial reporting
 Regulatory compliance

CPA exam

To become a CPA in the United States, the candidate must sit for and pass the Uniform Certified Public Accountant Examination (Uniform CPA Exam), which is set by the American Institute of Certified Public Accountants (AICPA) and administered by the National Association of State Boards of Accountancy (NASBA). The Uniform CPA Exam consists of the following sections: Auditing and Attestation (AUD), Financial Accounting and Reporting (FAR), Regulation (REG), and Business Environment Concepts (BEC). The CPA designation was first established in law in New York State on April 17, 1896.

Before 1917, individual states had their own licensing examinations where accountants could earn the CPA credential, but this differed significantly from state to state. The exams were administered to further the cause of professional cohesion among the accounting profession, verified membership to practice accounting, and for individuals to earn membership in the Institute of Public Accountants (IPA). In response to these factors, the first uniform exam was held on June 14–15, 1917. It established four sections: Auditing, Commercial Law, Accounting Theory and Practice Part 1, and Accounting Theory and Practice Part 2. The Commercial Law and Accounting Theory and Practices sections were precursors to the REG (Business Law and Tax) and FAR (Financial Accounting) sections. The Auditing, Business Law, and Accounting Theory exam segments were each 3.5 hours in length and totaled 10.5 hours. The Accounting Practice Parts I and II were both 4.5 hours in length, totaling to 9 hours. All states would start using the standard CPA exam administered by the organization which would eventually become the AICPA by 1952. The use of calculators was forbidden on the exam until 1994.

Prior to 2004, individuals had to take all four sections of the CPA exam in the span of two days. In 2004, upon recommendation by the AICPA, there was a shift to take the four sections at different dates. Also in 2004, the CPA exam moved from paper and pencil to an online format. The shift to online allowed the exam to test application and technological skills through task-based simulations. It also led to an increased emphasis on information technology with regards to risk assessment for internal controls.

While not as significant as the changes to come in 2024, the CPA exam saw some changes in 2017. The biggest change in 2017 was the amount of knowledge required to answer each of the questions. Before 2017, questions on the CPA exam tested the applicants’ remembering and understanding of the concept. Remembering and understanding corresponds to the lowest levels of Bloom’s Taxonomy. Starting in 2017, examiners wanted to include questions that tested higher levels of Bloom’s Taxonomy. As such, the number of questions testing remembering and understanding was reduced and questions that tested an applicant’s analysis and application of a skill were added to the CPA exam. Examiners saw that employers of new CPAs would require the use of analysis and application of skills instead of basic remembering and understanding.

Specifically, the Regulation (REG) section of the CPA exam saw changes in 2017. While the REG section of the CPA exam does not test the highest levels of Bloom’s taxonomy, 60–80 percent of the questions on the exam test analysis and application skills. Only 25–35 percent of questions test remembering and understanding following the changes to the exam. Prior to the changes, a majority of questions were remembering and understanding. The Auditing and Attestation (AUD) section will test the highest levels of Bloom’s Taxonomy in the form of evaluation questions. In addition, the REG exam allotted more time in the newer version to four hours versus three hours for the older exam. The 2017 version now contains 76 multiple choice questions and either eight or nine task-based simulations to further application based learning.

In 2019, the AICPA conducted a study that showed that CPAs needed an increased skill set in data analytics, excel, and overall, more technological skills. While the CPA exam tested knowledge on information technology, employers believed that not enough was being tested. This led to the evolution of the 2024 exam, known as the Core+Discipline Model. Starting in 2024, all CPA candidates will take the same three core sections of Accounting, Auditing, and Taxation. Then each candidate will have a choice between Taxation Compliance and Planning, Business Reporting and Analysis, and Information Systems Control. The new model will allow candidates to show a deeper knowledge of the content while still testing the foundation of accounting principles. It will also allow candidates to demonstrate a knowledge of technology, critical thinking skills, advanced problem-solving skills, and sound professional judgment which is an important skill used in the workplace and profession.

Eligibility to sit for the Uniform CPA Exam is determined by individual state boards of accountancy. Many states have adopted what is known as the "150 hour rule" (150 college semester units or the equivalent), which usually requires an additional year of education past a regular 4-year college degree, or a master's degree. Some universities offer a 5-year combined bachelor's/master's degree program, allowing a student to earn both degrees while receiving the 150 hours needed for exam eligibility.

The Uniform CPA Exam tests general principles of state law such as the laws of contracts and agency (questions not tailored to the variances of any particular state) and some federal laws as well.

Other licensing and certification requirements
Although the CPA exam is uniform, licensing and certification requirements are imposed separately by each state's laws and therefore vary from state to state.

State requirements for the CPA qualification can be summed up as the Three Es—education, examination and experience. The education requirement normally must be fulfilled as part of the eligibility criteria to sit for the Uniform CPA Exam. The examination component is the Uniform CPA Exam itself. Some states have a two-tier system whereby an individual would first become certified—usually by passing the Uniform CPA Exam. That individual would then later be eligible to be licensed once a certain amount of work experience is accomplished. Other states have a one-tier system whereby an individual would be certified and licensed at the same time when both the CPA exam is passed and the work experience requirement has been met.

Two-tier states include Alabama, Florida, Illinois, Montana, and Nebraska. The trend is for two-tier states to gradually move towards a one-tier system. Since 2002, the state boards of accountancy in Washington and South Dakota have ceased issuing CPA "certificates" and instead issue CPA "licenses". Illinois planned to follow suit in 2012.

A number of states are two-tiered, but require work experience for the CPA certificate, such as Ohio and Pennsylvania.

Work experience requirement
The experience component varies from state to state:
 The two-tier states generally do not require that the individual have work experience to receive a CPA certificate. Work experience is required, however, to receive a license to practice.
 Some states, such as Massachusetts, waive the work experience requirement for those with a higher academic qualification compared to the state's requirement to appear for the Uniform CPA.
 The majority of states still require work experience to be of a public accounting nature, namely two years audit or tax experience, or a combination of both. An increasing number of states, however, including Oregon, Virginia, Georgia and Kentucky, accept experience of a more general nature in the accounting area. In Texas, only one year of experience in accounting under the supervision of a CPA is required; such experience does not have to be in public accounting. This allows persons to obtain the CPA designation while working for a corporation's finance function.
 The majority of states require an applicant's work experience to be verified by someone who is already licensed as a CPA. This requirement can cause difficulties for applicants based outside the United States. However, some states such as Colorado and Oregon also accept work experience certified by a Chartered Accountant.

Ethics
Over 40 of the state boards now require applicants for CPA status to complete a special examination on ethics, which is effectively a fifth exam in terms of requirements to become a CPA. The majority of these accept the AICPA self-study Professional Ethics for CPAs CPE course or another course in general professional ethics. Many states, however, require that the ethics course include a review of that state's specific rules for professional practice.

Continuing professional education
Like other professionals, CPAs are required to take continuing education courses toward continuing professional development (continuing professional education [CPE]) to renew their license. Requirements vary by state (Wisconsin does not require any CPE for CPAs) but the vast majority require an average of 40 hours of CPE every year with a minimum of 20 hours per calendar year. The requirement can be fulfilled through attending live seminars, webcast seminars, or through self-study (textbooks, videos, online courses, all of which require a test to receive credit). In general, state boards accept group live and group internet-based credits for all credit requirements, while some states cap the number of credits obtained through the self-study format. All CPAs are encouraged to periodically review their state requirements. As part of the CPE requirement, most states require their CPAs to take an ethics course at some frequency (such as every or every other renewal period). Ethics requirements vary by state and the courses range from 2–8 hours. AICPA guidelines (which are adopted by many state boards) grant licensees 1 hour of CPE credit for every 50 minutes of instruction.

Loss of licensure
A CPA license may be suspended or revoked for various reasons. Common reasons include these:
Allowing the license to lapse without renewing in a timely manner.
Performing attestation services under an unlicensed/unregistered CPA firm or under a CPA firm permit which has expired.
Continuing to hold out as an active CPA on an expired license, which includes continued use of the CPA title on business cards, letterhead, office signage, correspondence, etc. after the license has expired.
Using fraud or deceit in obtaining or renewing the CPA license, the most common occurrence being misrepresenting or falsifying compliance with or completion of the continuing education requirements as a condition for renewal.
Being suspended or barred from practicing before another regulatory body such as the SEC or the IRS.
"Discreditable acts", which can include
failure to follow applicable standards (such as auditing standards when examining financial statements, or tax code when preparing tax returns); or 
violation of felony or serious misdemeanor criminal laws, which may or not be related to the practice of accountancy. (A notable example of a CPA whose license was revoked for non-financial related criminal activity is John Battaglia, convicted of the capital murders of his children).

Impact of technology 
Many tasks that a CPA used to do while working have now been automated. Therefore current and future CPAs are required to do more complex tasks with technology as the simpler tasks have become automated. An example of a more complex task would include analyzing and interpreting data using a visualization software. Technology is used regularly in the job to the point where technological proficiency is needed when starting as a CPA.

Since technological proficiency is more important than in prior years, accounting organizations have begun starting to teach technology within the accounting curricula in colleges and universities. One big change was in 2013, when the Association to Advance Collegiate Schools of Business (AACSB) mandated that information technology be included in all accredited accounting programs. The transition to add information technology has not been one without challenges. One specific challenge with regards to adding information technology into accounting curricula is the balance of preparing students for the CPA exam and preparing to work as a CPA following graduation. Preparing for the CPA exam and preparing to work as a CPA after graduation can be different, making this difficult for professors and schools to figure out what to include in their curricula. Instructors generally agree that including data analytics should be included when teaching about accounting information systems as a whole but few instructors think that data analytics should be in the entire accounting curricula at schools.

Demographics of CPAs 
A disparity exists among the demographics of AICPA members, specifically as it relates to class and gender. Between 1976 and 2005, 77% of CPAs were either middle or upper class and nearly half of all CPA candidates belonged to an upper middle class socioeconomic background. Although AICPA membership is predominated by individuals from wealthier socioeconomic backgrounds, 20% of AICPA members were lower class between 1976 and 2005. This indicates that the CPA profession is not exclusionary, but rather that it provides upward social and economic mobility. While women only accounted for 2.4% of all CPAs between 1934 and 1975, 50-60% of all hiring's by CPA firms were women between 2001 and 2010. Considering the unique barriers female CPAs may experience within the accounting profession, it is theorized that female CPAs come from higher socioeconomic backgrounds to overcome any gender bias they may experience. This would elucidate the higher prevalence of wealthy AICPA members who are women. These findings indicate that the demographic discrepancies among AICPA members have narrowed significantly in recent years.

Practice mobility: the substantial equivalency rule
An accountant is required to meet the legal requirements of any state in which the accountant wishes to practice.

In recent years, practice mobility for CPAs has become a major business concern for CPAs and their clients. Practice mobility for CPAs is the general ability of a licensee in good standing from a substantially equivalent state to gain practice privilege outside of the practitioner's home state without getting an additional license in the state where the CPA will serve a client or an employer. In today's digital age, many organizations require the professional services of CPAs to conduct business on an interstate and international basis and have compliance responsibilities in multiple jurisdictions. As a result, the practice of CPAs often extends across state lines and international boundaries.

Differing requirements for CPA certification, reciprocity, temporary practice and other aspects of state accountancy legislation in the 55 U.S. licensing jurisdictions (the 50 states, Puerto Rico, the District of Columbia, the U.S. Virgin Islands, Guam and the Commonwealth of the Northern Mariana Islands) make the interstate practice and mobility of CPAs more complicated. By removing boundaries to practice in the U.S., CPAs are able to more readily serve individuals and businesses in need of their expertise. At the same time, the state board of accountancy's ability to discipline is enhanced by being based on a CPA and the CPA firm's performance of services (either physically, electronically or otherwise within a state), rather than being based on whether a state license is held.

The American Institute of Certified Public Accountants (AICPA) and the National Association of State Boards of Accountancy (NASBA) have analyzed the current system for gaining practice privileges across state lines and have endorsed a uniform mobility system. This model approach is detailed through the substantial equivalency provision (Section 23) of the Uniform Accountancy Act (UAA). The UAA is an "evergreen" model licensing law co-developed, maintained, reviewed and updated by the AICPA and NASBA. The model provides a uniform approach to regulation of the accounting profession.

Under Section 23 of the UAA, a CPA licensed in a jurisdiction with requirements essentially equivalent to those outlined in the UAA is deemed to be substantially equivalent. Requirements may include:
 Obtaining 150 credit hours (150 college semester units or the equivalent) with a baccalaureate degree;
 Minimum one year of CPA experience;
 Passing the Uniform CPA Examination.

Uniform adoption of the UAA's substantial equivalency provision creates a system similar to the nation's driver's license program by providing CPAs with mobility while retaining and strengthening state boards’ ability to protect the public interest. The system enables consumers to receive timely services from the CPA best suited to the job, regardless of location, and without the hindrances of unnecessary filings, forms and increased costs that do not protect the public interest.

As of October 2012, a total of 49 out of the 50 states and the District of Columbia had passed mobility laws and were in the implementation and navigation phases. Only the Commonwealth of the Northern Mariana Islands, the Virgin Islands, Hawaii, Puerto Rico, and Guam have not passed mobility laws. A California mobility law went into effect July 1, 2013. The District of Columbia passed mobility laws effective on October 1, 2012.

AICPA membership
The CPA designation is granted by individual state boards, not the American Institute of Certified Public Accountants (AICPA). Membership in the AICPA is not obligatory for CPAs, although some CPAs do join. To become a full member of AICPA, the applicant must hold a valid CPA certificate or license from at least one of the fifty-five U.S. state/territory boards of accountancy; some additional requirements apply.

AICPA members approved a proposed bylaw amendment to make eligible for voting membership individuals who previously held a CPA certificate/license or have met all the requirements for CPA certification in accordance with the Uniform Accountancy Act (UAA). The AICPA announced its plan to accept applications from individuals meeting these criteria, beginning no later than January 1, 2011.

State CPA association membership
CPAs may also choose to become members of their local state association or society (also optional). Benefits of membership in a state CPA association range from deep discounts on seminars that qualify for continuing education credits to protecting the public and profession's interests by tracking and lobbying legislative issues that affect local state tax and financial planning issues.

CPAs who maintain state CPA society memberships are required to follow a society professional code of conduct (in addition to any code enforced by the state regulatory authority), further reassuring clients that the CPA is an ethical business professional conducting a legitimate business who can be trusted to handle confidential personal and business financial matters. State CPA associations also serve the community by providing information and resources about the CPA profession and welcome inquiries from students, business professionals and the public-at-large.

CPAs are not normally restricted to membership in the state CPA society in which they reside or hold a license or certificate. Many CPAs who live near state borders or who hold CPA status in more than one state may join more than one state CPA society.

State Associations
 Missouri Society of Certified Public Accountants (MOCPA)
 California Society of Certified Public Accountants (CalCPA)
 Florida Institute of Certified Public Accountants (FICPA)
 Indiana CPA Society (INCPAS)
 Kentucky Society of CPAs (KyCPA)
 Maryland Association of CPAs (MACPA)
 Minnesota Society of Certified Public Accountants (MNCPA)
 Nevada Society of Certified Public Accountants (NVCPA)
 Pennsylvania Institute of Certified Public Accountants (PICPA)
 Tennessee Society of Certified Public Accountants (TSCPA)
 Wisconsin Institute of Certified Public Accountants (WICPA)

See also
 Accountant
 CPA Magazine
 Institute of Certified Public Accountants in Ireland (CPA Ireland)
 Certified Management Accountant by the Institute of Management Accountants
 Certified National Accountant (Nigeria)
 Institute of Public Accountants
 Certified Practising Accountant (Australia)
 Chartered Certified Accountant (ACCA)
 Chartered Global Management Accountant
 Legal liability of certified public accountants

References

External links
Directory of State CPA Societies

Accounting qualifications
Accounting in the United States